Robert Ortlieb (1924–2011) was an American sculptor. His work uses wood, metal, marble and terracotta. Born in San Diego, Ortlieb received his Bachelor of Fine Arts and Master of Fine Arts from the University of Southern California (USC). He was taught by Francis de Erdely. He has won more than 35 awards and been exhibited in more than 80 museums and galleries. He taught at the Riverside Art Center and the Idyllwild Arts Foundation (the latter then a part of USC).

In 1957 a nine-foot walnut statue by Ortlieb of the Crucifixion of Jesus entitled "For They Know Not What They Do" was placed in Westwood Community Methodist Church. Ortlieb described it as including "every conflict imaginable: life and death, struggle, good and evil, intense suffering and powerful spiritual message." In March of that year associate pastor Dr. Alfred W. Painter said there had been objections to the sculpture but that its overall impact had been positive. The next month, however, Ortlieb was told to remove the work "in the interest of the congregation." Painter said he wished the sculpture could remain, but that "its effectiveness made the congregation uncomfortable." Ortlieb said "If one person got the message I have instilled in the statue I feel I have accomplished what I wanted to do."

In 1998, Ortlieb's bronze sculpture "Emergence", which was then on loan to the city of Oceanside, California and displayed in the foyer of the city's Planning Department, was mysteriously covered with a curtain or drapery material. In 2000 the same work, which weighs 480 pounds and was completed in 1979, was included in an exhibition at the Palos Verdes Art Center entitled "Big Sculpture".

References

1924 births
20th-century American sculptors
2011 deaths
USC Roski School of Fine Arts alumni
21st-century American sculptors